James Lassiter is an American film producer, known for being co-founder of Overbrook Entertainment and longtime business partner of actor and rapper Will Smith.

Career
Lassiter attended University of Miami and Temple University and befriended Jeffrey "Jazzy Jeff" Townes, who was in a rap duo with then-musician Will Smith.  Lassiter met Smith through Townes, and he later became Smith's road manager.  They worked together for two decades.  Lassiter briefly worked with other companies including Handprint and The Firm, but he returned to being Will Smith's business partner.  Lassiter and Smith formed the production company Overbrook Entertainment, which produced films like Hitch and ATL.  While Overbrook Entertainment had a deal with Universal Studios to produce films, none resulted, and the company was taken to Sony.  The pair sought to market each of their productions to a different foreign market, promoting I, Robot in Russia and Ali in South Africa.

Filmography
He was a producer in all films unless otherwise noted.

Film

Music department

Television

Thanks

References

External links

African-American film producers
American film producers
Living people
Temple University alumni
University of Miami alumni
Year of birth missing (living people)
21st-century African-American people